Michael Cryans (born ) is an American politician and former banker formerly serving as a member of the Executive Council of New Hampshire from 1st district.

Early life and education 
Cryans was born in Littleton, New Hampshire. After graduating from Littleton High School, he earned a Bachelor of Arts degree in Physical Education from Springfield College.

Career 
After graduating from college, Cryans returned to Littleton High School as a teacher before starting a career in banking. Cryans served as Vice President of the Dartmouth Banking Company and later worked as Executive Director of Headrest, Inc., a substance abuse rehabilitation facility located in Lebanon, New Hampshire. 

A Democrat, Cryans took office on January 2, 2019 after defeating Republican incumbent Joseph Kenney in the 2018 general election. He had previously sought the seat in 2014 and 2016, but lost both times to Kenney.

Personal life 
Cryans lives in Hanover, New Hampshire with his wife, Julie. They have two sons and two grandchildren.

References

New Hampshire Democrats
Members of the Executive Council of New Hampshire
21st-century American politicians
People from Littleton, New Hampshire
Springfield College (Massachusetts) alumni
Year of birth missing (living people)
Living people